Upper Ojai is a rural valley with several unincorporated communities in Ventura County, California.

It is located east of city of Ojai on State Route 150 (Ojai−Santa Paula Road), between Ojai and Santa Paula.

It is home to the Besant Hill School, a private boarding school for grades 9 to 12; and the Ojai Foundation spiritual retreat center.

References

Unincorporated communities in Ventura County, California
Ojai, California
Unincorporated communities in California